Rougham may refer to:
Rougham, Norfolk, England
Rougham, Suffolk, England
Rougham, County Cork, a townland in Ireland, see List of townlands of the barony of Bear
William Rougham, the second master of Gonville Hall, Cambridge